This is a list of hills in Hampshire. It is based on the online Database of British and Irish Hills, Jackson's More Relative Hills of Britain and list of 30 metre prominences and the Ordnance Survey mapping service.

Many of these hills are important historic, archaeological and nature conservation sites, as well as popular hiking and tourist destinations in the county of Hampshire in southern England.

Colour key 

The table is colour-coded based on the classification or "listing" of the hill. The types that occur in Hampshire are Marilyns, HuMPs and TuMPs, listings that are based on the topographical prominence. "Prominence" correlates strongly with the subjective significance of a summit. Peaks with low prominences are either subsidiary tops of a higher summit or relatively insignificant independent summits. Peaks with high prominences tend to be the highest points around and likely to have extraordinary views.

A Marilyn is a hill of any height that has a prominence of at least 150 metres or about 500 feet. A "HuMP" (the acronym comes from "Hundred Metre Prominence) is a hill with a prominence of at least 100 but less than 150 metres. In this table Marilyns are in beige and HuMPs in lilac. The term "sub-Marilyn" or "sub-HuMP" is used, e.g. in the Database of British and Irish Hills to indicate hills that fall just below the threshold.

To qualify for inclusion, hills must either be 200 metres or higher with a prominence of at least 30 metres, below 200 metres with a prominence of at least 90 metres (the threshold for a sub-HuMP), or be in some other way notable. For further information see the Lists of mountains and hills in the British Isles and the individual articles on Marilyns, HuMPs and TuMPs.

In this context, "TuMP" is used to connote a hill with a prominence of at least 30 but less than 100 metres. By way of contrast, see also the article listing Tumps (a traditional term meaning a hillock, mound, barrow or tumulus).

The county tops (i.e. highest points) of Portsmouth and Southampton unitary authorities are not strictly in the modern county of Hampshire, but are included because they fall within Hampshire's historic county boundary.

Table 

The following summits have been omitted from the table as they are considered sub-peaks, alternative names of hills in the main list or are otherwise not eligible at this stage:
 Cottington's Hill or King John's Hill, Kingsclere, Hampshire Downs
 Stoner Hill, Hampshire Downs, East Hampshire Hangers is a subsidiary summit of Wheatham Hill.

See also 
 List of mountains and hills of the United Kingdom
 List of Marilyns in England
 Geology of Hampshire

References and footnotes 

 
Hampshire
Hills